The Grand Duchy of Mecklenburg Friedrich-Franz Railway grouped various  steam locomotives built between 1849 and 1856 into its Class II. These included five locomotives that had originally been delivered with a  wheel arrangement.

History 
Between 1849 and 1851 Borsig delivered five  locomotives to the Mecklenburg Railway Company. These differed, however, from the engines supplied at the same time which were later categorized as the Class I. Locomotives BERLIN, BÜTZOW, WARNOW, MAGDEBURG and STRELITZ were given operating numbers 7, 8, 11, 12 and 15. Soon after entering service it became apparent that, when hauling goods trains between Schwerin and Rostock, the locomotives were reaching the limit of their capability. With an adhesive weight of 12 t the locomotives were not suited for such duties.  As a result, from 1851 Borsig supplied four  locomotives. Engines HERCULES, OBOTRIT, SWANTEWIT and RADEGAST were given numbers 16, 18, 19 and 21. On the nationalization of the railways in 1873, RADEGAST was renamed KIEL because there was already a Class VIII on the state-owned Frederick-Francis Railway with the former name. In 1895 BÜTZOW, WARNOW, STRELITZ and HERCULES were given numbers 2, 6, 7 and 8. The first loco to be retired was KIEL in 1891. The last was STRELITZ which remained on duty until 1903.

The five 2-2-2 locomotives were later converted to 2-4-0s.

The engines worked the lines between Schwerin and Rostock and Bützow and Güstrow.

Design features 
The locomotives had inside forked frames. The triple-shelled boiler had a steam dome on the centre shell. The vertical boiler had a raised firebox cover and a safety valve.

The two-cylinder wet steam engine was on the outside. The cylinders set horizontally and drive the coupling rod on the first axle. The steam chests were, like the Stephenson valve gear, on the inside.

The coupled axles were sprung underneath with leaf springs. Weight balancing was achieved using an equalising beam between the springs. The front carrying wheels had leaf springs above the axles.

The screw brake was located on the tender. The locomotives had a spacious driver's cab with side windows.

The locomotives were equipped with 2 T 4.45 and 3 T 7.90 class tenders.

Literature 

2-4-0 locomotives
2-2-2 locomotives
02
Railway locomotives introduced in 1849
Borsig locomotives
Standard gauge locomotives of Germany
1B n2 locomotives